Henry Lowther, 3rd Viscount Lonsdale,  (16947 March 1751) was an English courtier and landowner.

Life
He was a son of John Lowther, 1st Viscount Lonsdale and Katherine Thynne.

He succeeded to the Viscountcy in 1713, upon the death of his elder brother, Richard Lowther, 2nd Viscount Lonsdale. During the 1715 rising, he and the Lord Lieutenant of Cumberland, the Earl of Carlisle assembled the Cumberland and Westmorland militia at Penrith's Beacon Fell with the posse comitatus, but the citizen army disintegrated upon the approach of the Earl of Derwentwater's troops. Lonsdale found twenty of his servants the only persons faithful to him, and was compelled to retire to Appleby Castle.

His brave, if futile conduct, won admiration. He was appointed a Lord of the Bedchamber to George I on 19 July 1717. He held the post for ten years, although he much preferred country life to that of London. He was sworn of the Privy Council and appointed Constable of the Tower of London in 1726, but he resigned the constableship in 1731, also because of his desire to live in the country. During this period, Lowther Hall was badly damaged by fire in 1718, and he spent little time there. In 1720, during the collapse of the South Sea Bubble, he may have lost as much as £30,000, worsening the condition of an estate already weakened by his gambling at cards and on the turf. He also spent significant sums to secure the burgage tenures of Appleby, bringing that borough under the family's control.

Appointed Lord Lieutenant of Cumberland and Westmorland in 1738, he was, by virtue of that office, responsible for the defense of those counties during the Rising of '45. However, he remained at his sister Elizabeth's house at Byram, Yorkshire during that period, Lowther Hall being uninhabitable due to alterations, and left military affairs largely in the hands of Sir George Fleming, Bt, Bishop of Carlisle. He died at Byram on 7 March 1751 and was buried on 18 March at Lowther Hall. The viscountcy became extinct on his death; his baronetcy and estates went to his second cousin James.

References

|-

1694 births
1751 deaths
Fellows of the Royal Society
Lord-Lieutenants of Cumberland
Lord-Lieutenants of the Tower Hamlets
Lord-Lieutenants of Westmorland
Lords Privy Seal
Members of the Privy Council of Great Britain
Henry
3